Saint-Julien-sur-Garonne (literally Saint-Julien on Garonne; before September 2005: Saint-Julien) is a commune in the Haute-Garonne department in southwestern France.

Geography
The commune is bordered by six other communes: Saint-Élix-le-Château to the north, Salles-sur-Garonne across the river Garonne to the northeast, Lavelanet-de-Comminges to the west, Rieux-Volvestre to the east, Gensac-sur-Garonne across the river Garonne to the south, and finally by Cazères to the southwest.

The river Garonne flows through the commune, making the suffix -sur-Garonne, forming a border with Gensac-sur-Garonne and Salles-sur-Garonne.

History
The commune of Saint-Julien was renamed to Saint-Julien-sur-Garonne in 2005 by a decision.

Population

The inhabitants of the commune are called Saint-Julienois

See also
Communes of the Haute-Garonne department

References

Communes of Haute-Garonne